Folakemi Titilayo Odedina (born January 21, 1965) is a Nigerian-born scientist and professor of pharmacy and medicine at the University of Florida. She is the principal investigator for the Prostate Cancer Transatlantic Consortium (CaPTC), a clinical research group using genomic science and environmental etiology to exploring disproportionate burden of prostate cancer among Black men funded by the NCI. She is a member of American Cancer Society's National Prostate Cancer Disparities Advisory Team.

Education
Odedina obtained her Bachelor of Science in Pharmacy at the Obafemi Awolowo University (OAU) (formerly known as University of Ife), Ile-Ife in 1986. In 1990, she started Ph.D program in Pharmaceutical Sciences at the University of Florida. She completed her Ph.D. in 1994. Her Ph.D. thesis was on the "Implementation of Pharmaceutical Care in Community Practice: Development of a Theoretical Framework for Implementation". After her Ph.D., she worked as Assistant Professor at West Virginia University.

Early years
Odedina was born on January 21, 1965, in Abeokuta, Ogun State, Nigeria to Ezekiel Shotayo Badejogbin and Grace Modupe Badejogbin. She spent her early childhood in Lagos and schooled at the Apostolic Church Primary School and Methodist Girls High School, Lagos.

Career
Odedina is a professor of Medicine and Pharmacy, at the Department of Radiation Oncology and the Department of Pharmacotherapy & Translational Research of the University of Florida. She is also the Program Director of Florida-California Cancer Research, Education and Engagement (CaRE2) Health Equity Center- a National Cancer Institute funded U54 award.   
Odedina scientific works focused on genetic, environmental determinants of prostate cancer disparity. She also research on understanding the predictor of health disparities among Black men and exploration of behavioural interventions to improve the issues. She has led over 30 research projects prostate cancer disparities. In 2006, she received the Fulbright Specialists Program to assess cancer data reporting system in Nigeria. She conducted the first national cancer research project on cancer data reporting system in Nigeria and was one of the leading authors of the Nigeria's first National Cancer Control Plan (NCCP).  
 
Odedina has mentored over 300 African scientists. She is the Chair of the Research Committee for the African Organisation for Research and Training in Cancer (AORTIC). In 2017, she was awarded Carnegie African Diaspora Fellowship to work on prostate cancer risk and the development of oncology clinical trial virtual platforms at the University of Cape Town.

In an interview with SciDev in 2020, Odedina said that she experienced gender discrimination, when a female professor told her that she would not be able to finish her graduate programme because of marriage and pregnancy during her graduate school.

She is the principal investigator of Prostate Cancer Transatlantic Consortium (CaPTC), a United States National Institute of Health/National Cancer Institute funded consortium that has over 50 institution members and research sites in Africa, Europe, North America and the Caribbean.

Awards and recognition
She has received many awards for her contributions to sciences and health disparities, her awards includes Leadership Award for Health Disparities by American Society of Health-Systems Pharmacy and the Association of Black Health-System Pharmacists in 2009,Inspiring Women in STEM Award 2016 by INSIGHT Into Diversity, Living Legend Award by Clinical Trial Summit in 2017, William Award for Innovation in Cancer Care by African Organisation for Research and Training in Cancer (AORTIC) 2017

References

Nigerian scientists
1965 births
Nigerian oncologists
Living people
Nigerian emigrants to the United States
American people of Yoruba descent
African-American scientists
American scientists
Yoruba women scientists
American women scientists
Cancer researchers
Nigerian women scientists
Nigerian women academics
Yoruba women academics
Obafemi Awolowo University alumni
University of Florida alumni
Methodist Girls' High School alumni
West Virginia University faculty
American women academics
21st-century African-American people
20th-century African-American people
20th-century African-American women
21st-century African-American women